Carnival of Fear is a 1993 fantasy horror novel by J. Robert King, set in the world of Ravenloft, and based on the Dungeons & Dragons game.

Plot summary
In a centuries-old grand carnival in the realm of l'Morai run by the Puppetmaster, the apparent murder of a carnival dwarf leads to a trial to find the killer.

Reception
A reviewer from Publishers Weekly comments that King "offers a simple but effective message about the evils of scapegoating in his fantasy-horror tale [...] King's careful progress from a basic murder to a much larger mystery, which ultimately encompasses the entire carnival, gives the book the momentum needed to keep the pages turning."

Reviews
Kliatt

References

1993 American novels
Ravenloft novels